Results from the 1999 Buenos Aires Grand Prix held at Buenos Aires on August 29, 1999, in the Autódromo Oscar Alfredo Gálvez.The race was the first race at weekend.

Classification 

Buenos Aires Grand Prix
1999 in motorsport
1999 in Argentine motorsport
August 1999 sports events in South America